Eknathi Bhagwat is a book written by Sant Eknath of the Marathi faith. This is major work of Varkari Sampradaya. Eknath had begun writing the Eknathi Bhagwat in Paithan finishing it in Varanasi.

References

External links
 https://web.archive.org/web/20130712004547/http://santeknath.org/vagmayavishayi.html
 https://web.archive.org/web/20130712004512/http://santeknath.org/eknathi%20bhagwat.html

Warkari
Indian non-fiction books